The 1894 Drake Bulldogs football team was an American football team that represented Drake University as an independent during the 1894 college football season. In its first and only season under head coach W. W. Wharton, the team compiled a 2–2 record and was outscored by a total of 48 to 34.

Schedule

References

Drake
Drake Bulldogs football seasons
Drake Bulldogs football